A Corner of the Universe is a 2002 young adult novel by Ann M. Martin. It won a Newbery Honor Award in 2003.

Characters
Hattie Owen: An 11-almost-12-year-old girl; protagonist who lives in and runs a boarding house. 

Adam Mercer: Hattie's mentally ill uncle who turns Hattie's life around, 21 years old. He is a huge fan of I Love Lucy.

Jonathan Owen: Hattie's father and an artist who helps run the family boarding house. 

Dorothy Owen: Hattie's mother and Adam's older sister. 

Harriet "Nana" Mercer: Hattie's strict and wealthy grandmother. 

Hayden "Papa" Mercer: Hattie's grandfather and a Millerton lawyer. 

Miss Hagerty: A boarder living in the Owen boardinghouse. She serves as a grandmother-figure to Hattie. 

Angel Valentine: The beautiful new boarder living in the Owen boarding house. Adam develops feelings for her but dies by suicide after seeing her with her new boyfriend. 

Leila: The daughter of Fred Carmel of Fred Carmel's Funtime Carnival, becomes a close friend of Hattie. 

Mr. Penny: A clockmaker and boarder of the Owen's boardinghouse.

Plot
The summer of 1960 is a season that the novel's narrator and protagonist, 11-almost-12-year-old Hattie Owen, expects to be as comfortably uneventful as all the others had been in her small, tranquil town of Millerton, Pennsylvania. She's looking forward to helping her mother Dorothy run their boarding house with its eccentric adult boarders, painting alongside her father Jonathan, and reading. 

Then 21-year-old Uncle Adam, whom Hattie never knew existed, comes to stay with Hattie's grandparents (Nana and Papa), because his "school," an institution for the mentally disabled, has closed down permanently. Intelligent, childlike, and strange owing to his disability, Adam visits Hattie often. Adam quickly becomes smitten with Angel Valentine, the beautiful and most recent lodger to check into the Owen boardinghouse. 

Hattie then meets Leila, the daughter of the carnival owners who come to town. However, after Adam suffers a mental breakdown on the Ferris wheel, she moves away with the carnival.

Throughout the summer, other people come to stay at Hattie's boarding house, such as a woman with a son and daughter who recently suffered the death of her husband and moved away, but needed a place to stay while job hunting.

As various other events mark Hattie's "uneventful" summer, she comes to better understand Adam. But when Adam dies by suicide after seeing Angel sleeping with her new boyfriend, it leads everyone—including Hattie—to realize that none of them had understood Adam as much as he needed them to.

Sources cited 

2002 American novels
American children's novels
Newbery Honor-winning works
Fiction set in the 1960s
2002 children's books